Michał Gryziński (29 September 1930 - 1 June 2004) was a Polish nuclear physicist, plasma physics specialist and the founder of the free-fall atomic model, an alternative theoretical formulation, a classical approximation asking for trajectories of electron averaging to probability densities described by quantum mechanics.

History 
Michał Gryziński was working in a hot plasma group of the Polish Academy of Sciences on an approach to nuclear fusion which has later evolved to what is currently known as dense plasma focus. His experimental and theoretical consideration have led him 1957 to the "Stopping Power of a Medium for Heavy, Charged Particles" Phys. Rev. article emphasizing the importance of the orbital motion of electrons of a medium for stopping of slow charged particles. This work has received great interest and has led him to a series of articles about the problem of scattering with classical approximation of dynamics of the electrons, his 1965 articles have received a total of more than 2000 citations.

This classical approximation of the dynamics of electrons in atoms has led him to the free-fall atomic model to improve agreement with scattering experiments comparing to the popular Bohr approximation as circular orbits for electrons. This dominant radial dynamics of electrons makes the atom effectively a pulsating electric multipole (dipole, quadrupole), what allowed him to propose an explanation for the Ramsauer effect (1970) and improve agreement for modeling of low energy scattering (1975). His later articles try to expand these classical approximations to multielectron atoms and molecules.

Free-fall atomic model 

Gryzinski find the Bohr model unsatisfactory, and presents many other arguments, especially for agreement with various scattering scenarios, to focus on nearly zero angular momentum trajectories: with electrons traveling through nearly radial trajectories. Attracted by the Coulomb field they free-fall to the nucleus, then increase the distance up to some turning point and so on.

The free-fall atomic model focuses on Kepler-like orbits for very low angular momentum. This spin–orbit interaction is nearly negligible unless the electron passes very close to the nucleus (small , large ). This force bends the trajectory of the electron, preventing any collision with the nucleus.

For simplicity, most of these considerations neglect small changes of orientation of the spin axis of electron, assuming that it is firmly oriented in space - this is called rigid top approximation.
The magnetic moment of the nucleus is thousands of times smaller than the electron's, so such hyperfine corrections can be neglected in basic models.

Finally the basic considered Lagrangian for dynamics of a single electron in these models is:

The last term describes the interaction between the magnetic field of the traveling electron's magnetic moment and the electric field of the nucleus (spin–orbit interaction).

Bates and Snyder examined the free-fall model and found it unsatisfactory.

Primary sources

References

External links 
 Michal Gryzinski webpage with lectures

20th-century Polish physicists
1930 births
2004 deaths